Castle and Castle is a Nigerian series which premiered in the year 2018 and is streaming exclusively on Netflix. It is a Nigerian and Africa's first legal series which features the story of a legal family characterized by love, drama and betrayal. Castle and Castle currently has two seasons streaming on Netflix and it stars some A-list Nigerian actors like Richard Mofe-Damijo, Dakore Akande, Deyemi Okanlawon, Daniel Etim Effiong and many more.

Plot summary 
The series is a story of a law family (Husband, wife and son) running a very successful law firm who now finds themselves defending opposite interest in the legal world which in turn now has adverse effect on their happy marriage and family at large. The story features love, betrayal, trust and so many ups and down, the movie was shot in Lagos, Nigeria. The season one of the series was released in 2018 and it got a lot of positive comments from fans and it was accompanied with the season two which was released in 2021, announcing the release of the season two is the executive producer and co-creator of Castle and Castle, also the CEO, Ebonylife TV, Mo Abudu. The season 2 featured some new buzz and a lot of new addition of A-list actors like Bisola Aiyeola, Bimbo Ademoye, Mimi Chaka, Elozonam Ogbolu and many more.

Episodes 

 Season 1: 13 Episodes. 
 Season 2:  6 Episodes.

Cast and characters
The show's ensemble cast for Castle & Castle includes:

References

2010s Nigerian television series
2018 Nigerian television series debuts
English-language television shows
2018 films
Nigerian television series